Þorlákshöfn is a town on the southern coast of Iceland in the Municipality of Ölfus.

The town is named after Saint Thorlak who was a bishop at Skálholt. Its main importance is as a port as it has the only harbour on Iceland's southern coastline between Grindavík in the west and Höfn in the east. The port serves a direct weekly cargo ferries to Rotterdam and Hirtshals operated by Faroese Smyril Line. It is also one of two departure points for ferries to the Vestmannaeyjar archipelago. Services include restaurants, tourism, golf course, motocross field, camping, sport complex and a swimming pool. The town has several fish processing enterprises.

History and Culture 
The construction of Þorlákskirkja, a modern Protestant church, was started in 1979. The church was consecrated in 1985. There are various historic places near Þorlákshöfn, e.g., a wooden church dating from 1909 on the farm Kotströnd.

Infrastructure 
Þorlákshöfn has a hotel, a camping area, a golf course, various restaurants and a sports centre with a public swimming pool. The townhall of the municipality of Ölfus (Ráðhús Ölfuss) is in Þorlákshöfn. There are various shops, a supermarket, primary school, kindergarten, public library, health care centre (Heilsugaelustöð), pharmacy, a gas station and repairing station as well.

Sports
As of 2022, local football club Ægir plays in the third tier of Iceland's football pyramid. They play their home games at the Þorlákshafnarvöllur.

Notable people from Þorlákshöfn  

Bergþóra Árnadóttir Folk Singer
Birgitta Jónsdóttir Politician, Poet and Activist
 Jón Guðni Fjóluson: Footballer currently playing for IFK Norrköping
 Jónas Sigurðsson: (Jónas Sig) musician

References

Populated places in Southern Region (Iceland)